Fermín Trueba Pérez (26 August 1914 – 1 May 2007) was a Spanish road cyclist.

His brothers Vicente and José were also professional cyclists.

Major results

1934
 1st Subida a Santo Domingo
 1st Vuelta a Alava
 2nd Prueba Villafranca de Ordizia
1935
 1st Subida a Arantzazu
 2nd Overall Tour of Galicia
1st Stages 3 & 9
 2nd Subida a Santo Domingo
 7th Overall Tour of the Basque Country
 7th Clásica a los Puertos de Guadarrama
1936
 2nd Clásica a los Puertos de Guadarrama
 9th Overall Vuelta a España
1st Stage 19
1938
 1st  Road race, National Road Championships
 1st Subida a Santo Domingo
1939
 1st Clásica a los Puertos de Guadarrama
 1st Subida a Santo Domingo
 2nd Overall Vuelta a Aragón
1st Stages 3, 4 & 6
 3rd Road race, National Road Championships
 3rd Overall Volta a Catalunya
1st Stage 6
 3rd Overall Circuito del Norte
1st Stages 1 & 5
1940
 1st  Hill-climb, National Road Championships
 1st  Overall Vuelta a Cantabria
1st Mountains classification
1st Stages 2 & 3
 1st Subida a Santo Domingo
 1st Subida a Arantzazu
 2nd GP Pascuas
 2nd GP Vizcaya
 6th Overall Volta a Catalunya
 6th Clásica a los Puertos de Guadarrama
1941
 2nd Overall Vuelta a España
1st  Mountains classification
1st Stages 8 & 14
 1st  Hill-climb, National Road Championships
 1st Stage 7 Volta a Catalunya
 1st Stage 1 Vuelta Ciclista a Navarra
 1st Overall Circuito del Norte
1st Stage 8
 2nd Subida a Santo Domingo
1942
 1st  Hill-climb, National Road Championships
 1st Subida a Santo Domingo
 1st Subida al Naranco
 2nd Overall Circuito del Norte
1st Stages 4, 5b & 8
1943
 1st Overall Circuito Castilla-León-Asturias
1st Stages 1, 6 & 7
 1st Subida a Santo Domingo
 1st Stage 5 Vuelta a la Comunidad Valenciana
 1st Stage 5 GP Ayutamiento de Bilbao
 2nd Subida a Arantzazu
 5th Overall Volta a Catalunya
1st Stage 4b
 3rd Subida al Naranco
1944
 1st  Hill-climb, National Road Championships
 1st Stage 9 Volta a Catalunya
 1st Subida a Arantzazu
 2nd Subida al Naranco
 2nd Subida a Santo Domingo
 3rd Circuito de Getxo
1945
 1st Subida al Naranco
 1st Stage 2 Circuito del Norte
 2nd Circuito de Getxo
 2nd Subida a Santo Domingo
 2nd Subida a Arantzazu
 3rd Subida a Arrate
 5th Overall Tour of Galicia
1946
 1st Subida al Naranco

References

External links

1914 births
2007 deaths
Spanish male cyclists
Spanish Vuelta a España stage winners
People from Torrelavega
Cyclists from Cantabria